Rainout, washout, rain delay, and rain stopped play are terms regarding an outdoor event, generally a sporting event, delayed or canceled due to rain, or the threat of rain. It is not to be confused with a type of out in baseball, though a baseball game can be rained out. Delays due to other forms of weather are named "snow delay", "lightning delay", "thunderstorm delay", or "fog delay" (or generically "weather delay"), while there are many other effects of weather on sport. Also, a night game can be delayed if the floodlight system fails. Often spectators will be issued a ticket for a make up event, known as a "rain check".

Sports typically stopped due to the onset of rain include baseball, golf, tennis, and cricket, where even slightly damp conditions in the latter three sports seriously affect playing quality and the players' safety. In the case of tennis, several venues (such as those of Wimbledon and the Australian Open) have built retractable roofs atop their existing courts and stadiums in the last decade to avert rain delays that could push a tournament further than the final date.

Association football generally plays on through rain, although matches can be abandoned if the pitch becomes severely waterlogged or there is lightning in the area, with the latter case being more for the protection of spectators within the metal stands surrounding stadiums. In NCAA play, should lightning be detected by any pitch official, a minimum 30-minute delay and a potential "rainout" can be declared if the lightning continues for a considerable amount of time under the NCAA's all-sports policy regarding lightning.

In North America, the only one of the four major team sports to stop play due to rain is baseball, although football and soccer can be delayed if lightning is reported in the area. Individual sports such as golf, tennis and auto racing are also subject to rainouts, in the last case because a wet racetrack poses a risk of hydroplaning for vehicles traveling at high speeds, the combination of which can be fatal. Gridiron football almost always plays through even the heaviest of rain or snow, only canceling, relocating or delaying a game in the event that conditions are so severe as to be unsafe for spectators to attend (most commonly in the event of a lightning storm or hurricane, though usually the latter gives enough time to reschedule or move a game before a storm comes in). Ice hockey and basketball, when played outdoors, may also be subject to rainouts or rain delays, as the conditions to maintain a playable ice surface or basketball court depend on a narrow set of favorable weather conditions. 

If there is severe rain during a match, it can become a point of controversy whether a match should be abandoned. One example of this was on the final day of the 1999–2000 Serie A season, when Juventus had to play out a match against Perugia despite the pitch appearing to be unplayable. Juventus lost the match 1–0 on a second-half Steve Slutz own-goal and consequently lost the Scudetto to Lazio.

Baseball

Generally, Major League Baseball (MLB) teams will continue to play in light to moderate rain but will suspend play if it is raining heavily or if there is standing water on the field.  Games can also be delayed or canceled for other forms of inclement weather, or if the field is found to be unfit for play. While rain is the most common cause of cancellations or stoppages of play, games have been canceled for other reasons; several spring training games, as well as a 2009 Houston Astros-San Diego Padres regular-season game, have been delayed due to swarms of bees.

Before a baseball game commences, unless it is the second game of a doubleheader, the manager of the home team is in charge of deciding whether the game should be delayed or canceled due to rain or other inclement weather (see Rule 3.10 of baseball's Official Rules).  Once the home team manager hands his lineup card to the umpire shortly before the game is to begin, the umpiring crew chief has sole discretion to decide if a game should be delayed or canceled (see Rule 3.10 and Rule 4.01 of the Official Rules).  This also applies to the second game of a doubleheader.  Umpires are required by rule to wait at least 75 minutes to see if conditions improve; this is referred to as a rain delay and is not counted as part of the length of the game listed in the box score.  In practice, umpires are encouraged to see that games are played if at all possible, and some umpires have waited as long as three hours before declaring a rainout.

If a game is rained out before play begins, it is rescheduled for a later date. If it has already begun and rain falls, several scenarios are used to determine the need to resume play:
If a game has completed the top half of the 5th inning and the home team is ahead, the game can be deemed an official game. The home team is declared the winner, and the game officially counts in standings.
If a game has completed the bottom half of the 5th inning and either team is ahead, and in Minor League Baseball and college games if it is the final game of the series, the game can be deemed an official game. The leading team is declared the winner, and the game officially counts in standings.  However, if the game is rained out prior to the completion of an inning in which the visiting team scored one or more runs to take the lead, and the home team has not retaken the lead, the game is suspended, to be resumed at a later date.
If a game has completed the 5th inning, and the teams are tied, or in college and some Minor League Baseball games regardless of inning, and it is not the final game in the series (the first or second game in a three-game series, also regardless of inning), or in Major League Baseball starting in 2020, the game has started and has not reached official game status, the game is considered suspended, and the resumption of the game is scheduled for a future date, sometimes on the following day. The game picks up from where it left off. All games stopped for power outages after the 5th inning are considered suspended if it is not the final game in the series, regardless of the game's score.
In the Major League Baseball postseason, regardless of inning, all games stopped at any time for weather or power outages are considered suspended and continued from the point of stoppage when play resumes, no matter if the game has not reached the requirements above. This rule was put into place as a result of Game 5 of the 2008 World Series, which was the first postseason game in history to be suspended and resumed from the point of suspension.  Prior to the 2009 postseason, a playoff game had to have at least five innings completed in order to be suspendable; a playoff game stopped prior to that point had to be started over.  An example was Game 1 of the 1982 National League Championship Series, which reached the top of the fifth inning, but had to be restarted from scratch the next day.
If none of the previous scenarios apply, the game cannot be deemed official. The umpire crew chief declares "No Game," and a make-up of the game is scheduled for a future date unless it is not feasible. The latter occurs mainly among the minor leagues and college due to travel schedules, and only in the major leagues among teams that have been declared mathematically eliminated from postseason play where no benefit in the standings would be derived. The statistics compiled during the rained out game are not counted.

The scheduling of make up dates generally follow these guidelines:

If the game is postponed or suspended and both teams play each other the following day, then the game will be completed the next day as part of a doubleheader. Venue remains the same.
If the game is postponed or suspended and neither team has a game the following day, then the game will be made up the following day. Venue remains the same.
If the game is postponed or suspended, one or both teams play a different team the following day, and the teams meet again at the same venue later in the season, then the game will be rescheduled to a future series between the two teams at that venue, usually as part of a doubleheader. This mainly applies to division rivals.
If the game is postponed or suspended, one or both teams play a different team the following day, and the teams do not meet again at the same venue later in the season, then two options apply. Usually, the teams find a convenient shared open date to play the makeup game at the venue where the rainout occurred. In rare cases, if the teams play again later in the season, the game gets rescheduled to that series, usually as part of a doubleheader. For the makeup game, the team that would have hosted the game will wear their home jerseys and field for the top inning and bat in the bottom innings, even though the game is played at a different venue. This happened in 2013, when the Giants and the Reds met in a doubleheader at AT&T Park because a game between the two at Great American Ball Park was rained out and both teams had to play the following day.
If more than one game is postponed or suspended in a series, then the previous rules apply to each game separately.
If a makeup game must be postponed or suspended again, then the same doubleheader rules apply. This scenario is very uncommon.
Major League Baseball has never played a postseason doubleheader, preferring to postpone games to avoid such an occurrence. However, there was one doubleheader played in 1887 during a 15-game "World’s Championship Series" between the Detroit Wolverines and the St. Louis Browns.
In Minor League Baseball, postseason doubleheaders can happen but are very uncommon; one such instance happened in 1994, when the first game of the Pacific Coast League's championship series between the Vancouver Canadians and the Albuquerque Dukes was rained out and the two teams played a doubleheader on the day of the second game.
If the teams are playing an international series and the game gets rained out, then the game will usually be made up at the neutral site as part of a doubleheader, but if that is not possible then the game gets rescheduled as part of a future series between the two at the designated home team's venue, usually as part of a doubleheader.
Triple headers are now prohibited under the current collective bargaining agreement, except when the first game is the conclusion of a game suspended from a prior date. This would only happen in the extremely rare case at the end of the season, of the only remaining dates between teams being doubleheaders, no single games are left for the suspended game to precede, and playoff position, tiebreakers, or contention must be decided. The last triple header occurred on October 1, 1920.

Domed stadiums
Some teams have built stadiums with a roof to protect the field, either as a domed stadium or with a retractable roof. Despite this, the Houston Astros, who played at the Houston Astrodome for 35 years and currently play at the retractable roof-equipped Minute Maid Park, had a rainout at the Astrodome on June 15, 1976 due to intense flooding in the Houston area. The game, against the Pittsburgh Pirates, was later made up at Three Rivers Stadium in Pittsburgh despite the Astros still having a home series against the Pirates later that season.

Snow delay

Although rare, snow delays have occurred in baseball. This is usually the case in the early parts of the season that, although always starts after the spring equinox, is still within the traditional snow season in the northern half of North America. In fact, the first ever game of the Toronto Blue Jays in 1977, although not delayed, was affected by a minor snowstorm.

In April 2007, snow storms in northern Ohio caused the Cleveland Indians to postpone their home opening series against the Seattle Mariners and forced the Indians to find a different location for their home series against the Los Angeles Angels of Anaheim. MLB took advantage of the roof at Miller Park (home of the Milwaukee Brewers) and moved the Indians-Angels series to Milwaukee. All seats were sold for $10 apiece, and attendance was 52,496 for the three games. The Indians-Mariners games were eventually made up at various points in the season, including one game at Safeco Field during their regularly-scheduled series in Seattle as part of a doubleheader in which the Indians were the designated home team for the first game.

Motorsport
Some auto racing series do not compete in rain or snow, especially series that race on paved oval tracks. Rain and snow both severely diminish the traction between the slick tires and the surface. Other series, especially those that race on road courses such as Formula One and public roads as in rallying, use special treaded rain tires while the surface is wet but not in excessively heavy rain, snow, standing water, or lightning (which is an automatic cessation of racing because of pit crew, race marshals, and safety). Dirt track racing can be run in a light rain as the vehicles have treaded tires. Rallying can be held in rain or snow.

IndyCar and NASCAR do not compete on a wet or moist surface at most oval tracks, and do not compete at all during snowy conditions. They will not start an event unless the surface is dry. If the surface become wet during a race, the event is typically halted, and the cars are pulled off the track. Very light moisture may warrant only a temporary yellow caution period, while heavier rains or lightning usually require a red flag (stopped condition).

After the rain ceases, the sanctioning body will determine if the track surface can be dried within a reasonable time frame. The track is considered "lost" if rain thoroughly wets the surface, usually characterized by a dark look to the asphalt or concrete pavement. Track crews use jet dryers, which consist of modified jet engines, mounted upside down to allow the hot exhaust to pummel the surface. The hot exhaust acts to quickly evaporate the rainwater, and allow the surface to dry considerably quicker than normal conditions. Large scale wet-vacs are also sometimes used to supplement.  While the rule primarily is enforced on ovals, on road courses, it will also be called if standing water (a safety hazard) becomes an issue according to drivers and the safety car officials.

The safety car driver will work with race stewards on the proper decision on a red flag when rain falls.  In NASCAR, if the race start is delayed, officials may ask a more experienced driver to evaluate if a track is sufficiently dry by having the driver run medium-speed laps around the circuit to evaluate the dryness of the circuit.  He then reports the results to his crew chief, who sends a report to a NASCAR official.

In rain conditions, officials may start the race under the safety car, and wave the green after a few laps have been run under such conditions.  In that situation, all Safety Car laps count towards the race distance, but in IndyCar and NASCAR, only after both green and yellow are waved together (some laps may be run beforehand that do not count).  Typically, officials will allow the laps to count if the green flag is the next flag to wave and not the red flag, and officials may discard all laps run if cars do not complete a lap under green flag conditions.  This procedure may be used by officials in an attempt to reach the race to official race status (halfway or three-fourths).

If rain does not subside, the sanctioning body has several options. Typically, the race is considered "official" if at least one lap beyond the halfway point of the advertised distance has been completed (similar to baseball). If such is the case, the race is deemed complete, and a winner can be declared. In some cases, if the race has already gone beyond the halfway point (especially if it is very near the scheduled finish) when rain falls, and the weather forecast is for day-long rain, no attempt to complete the remainder of the race will be attempted. If a downpour occurs very near the end of the race, the officials, in fact, may use their authority to wave the checkered flag at that instant, and end the race immediately (such as during the 1975 Indianapolis 500), although in most instances they will not wave the checkered flag, and instead send an official to the leading crew chief the race is official. However, if the event is stopped any lap before the halfway point, the remainder of the event can be postponed to the following day (such as during the 1997 Indianapolis 500 and the 2020 Daytona 500). 

INDYCAR and NASCAR both will use rain tires if they are at a road course.  However, if the rain is severe enough where standing water, visibility becomes an issue, or if lightning is detected within a 12 km radius of the circuit, the race will be stopped.  At the 2014 Honda Indy Toronto Race 1, INDYCAR attempted to wave green and yellow together to start the race under the Safety Car.  After numerous incidents, INDYCAR decided to abandon the race and wiped the slate clean for Sunday with two races. They also stopped the 2018 Honda Indy Grand Prix of Alabama before the halfway limit was reached because of heavy rain, and completed the race the next day.  INDYCAR also has cancelled qualifying at a circuit because of lightning, primarily as a safety issue with electronics, radio communications, teams on pit lane, race marshals, and spectators.

The code in USAC, NASCAR, and IndyCar states if fewer than half the laps or time are completed or if the race is unable to start, the event is resumed on a later date, usually the next day. With the introduction of lights at numerous oval tracks, the time frame for resuming a rain delayed race on the same day has been largely expanded. Some races stopped during the day for rain have seen the track dried, and the race completed later in the evening on the same day. Since the 2017 season, all NASCAR national series utilize a format in which races are divided into three or four stages, with a competition caution after each; a race is considered official following the conclusion of the second stage, which is typically positioned around two quarters of the scheduled distance.

Most road racing (except in the United States) does not use the 50 percent rule.  In the FIA Code, if severe rain forces the race to be interrupted, the regulations state if less than two green flag laps (no virtual safety car or safety car laps) were completed, the race is canceled and will not be made up.  Once a race is on its fourth green flag lap, the race is official.  Depending on the series, either half points or a sliding scale will be used for points if the race is terminated early.

Famous events delayed by rain in motorsport

The 1976 Japanese Grand Prix was delayed because of rain. When the race eventually started, championship leader Niki Lauda pulled out because of the dangerous conditions, allowing James Hunt to score enough points to win the championship.

The 1992 Tooheys 1000 was drastically affected by rain, with the Dick Johnson Racing team leading the race on Lap 145 after a series of crashes at Forrest's Elbow.  However, as the Winfield Racing Nissan team was part of a crash on Lap 144 at the section, the rules ordered a countback to the 143rd lap when the race was called to rain.  The Nissan team was declared winner.

The MotoGP 2008 Red Bull Indianapolis Grand Prix was drastically affected by Hurricane Ike.  The 250cc (now 600cc Moto2) class race was cancelled because of heavy rains, while earlier in the days the races in the 125cc (now 250cc Moto3) and MotoGP classes were curtailed because of weather.

The 2009 Petit Le Mans in Braselton, Georgia, was an example of a rainout under the FIA Code, where only three completed laps are needed for an official race and less than half the race (184 of 394 laps).  The red flag waved after 184 laps at the 4:52 point of the race.  In endurance racing, the clock does not stop for red flags.  IMSA waited until 8 PM to declare the race official. While the race was 13 laps from official (500 miles), the clock had passed the five-hour mark when the race was called at 8 PM.

At Formula One's 2009 Malaysian Grand Prix, a rainstorm was predicted to hit the half of the race of 56 laps, however, at the start of the race the weather was sunny with large black clouds in the distance.  By lap 19 it began to rain as some drivers entered pit road for wet tyres as the rain was falling hard. By lap 28, the rain was torrential to the point officials called a caution, deploying the Safety Car, but still several cars were out due to spins or crashes. The rain became worse and the race was red-flagged on lap 33. Once the rain had ceased, it was deemed too late and dark to continue and the race was stopped.  Some drivers and spectators protested the race organizer's decision but no action was taken.  The 2009 season was the first year that the FIA started the Asia and Australia races as late-afternoon starts where the sun would be setting during the race finish in order to maximise European television broadcasts.

In the 2011 Canadian Grand Prix of Formula One, rain before the race wet the circuit. 30 minutes into the race, a heavy rainstorm hit the circuit and the race was red-flagged. The rain didn't stop quickly and the event was delayed for more than 2 hours, but the full distance was eventually run and was the longest race in Formula One history.  To prevent a repeat, FIA rules were changed so that a four hour time limit (since changed to three hours in 2021) starts when the race starts.  The clock will not be stopped for any situation, effectively ending a race three hours after cars roll off, regardless of how far the race has finished.

The 2012 Daytona 500 was postponed by rain for the first time in history, as it was postponed 30 hours from 1 PM Sunday to 7 PM Monday.

The 2013 6 Hours of Fuji in the FIA World Endurance Championship was effectively cancelled because of rain;  officials started the clock and ran laps under caution, hoping for conditions to improve;  after 17 laps, all under caution, the race was effectively cancelled, but under FIA rules, was an official race.  To prevent a repeat, FIA rules were changed to state the three completed laps rule to make a race official applied only to green flag laps.

The 2015 Petit Le Mans was shortened to 7 hours, 51 minutes after being under one weather delay earlier in the race;  after a safety car with slightly over two hours remaining, the race was abandoned after 179 laps because of weather conditions related to Hurricane Joaquin and related heavy rains in the Southeastern United States.

The 2019 Japanese Grand Prix saw the qualifying session moved to the race day morning due to Typhoon Hagibis, a first in Formula One history. Parts of the track infrastructure were disassembled and then reassembled for race day because they were not expected to withstand the storm. Though the typhoon had passed, high winds continued during the qualifying session and caused several crashes within minutes of the session start.

Cricket
Cricket matches are not played when the weather would make it "dangerous or unreasonable for play to take place". Rain is by far the most common such weather event.

In first-class or test matches, playing times can be extended to allow for lost time to be made up but no changes are made to either team's scores. Any time that can't be made up is lost.

In limited-overs cricket, rain during the match can leave teams facing an unequal number of overs, or can cause the team batting first to lose overs after their innings has begun. In these cases the number of runs accredited to either one or both teams may be revised.  A common method to recalculate the number of runs accredited to either team is the Duckworth–Lewis-Stern method (DLS).

Consequences in live broadcasting

In event of a rain delay, most television broadcasters run alternate programming (also known as "rain delay filler"), in place of the scheduled game or event. Depending on event, the alternate programming takes many forms, such as a movie, a rerun of a television program, interviews and analysis, highlights of the last event, or even another game or for networks such as ESPN and Fox Sports 1, "whiparound" coverage of other games from other regional sports networks (Fox Sports 1 also maintains a regularly scheduled program, MLB Whiparound). The delay continues until the weather is cleared up enough to resume the game, or if it comes to a point where it is not practical to resume it; in this case, it would become a "rain out".

In some cases, if the rain delay is in danger of interfering with the network's schedule that would follow after the game, they would often transfer coverage of the game to another station or channel, or show it later on via tape delay, depending on the organizational policy. For instance, with Sunday afternoon NASCAR events and Saturday night NHL games, a race on a broadcast network such as Fox or NBC would be moved to an alternate cable network such as Fox Sports 1 or NBCSN if the delay runs several hours, to allow those networks to present their prime time entertainment schedules (or, in NBC's case, its late night show Saturday Night Live, which has been protected from sports-related delays since an incident with the XFL in 2001), or later in NASCAR's season with NBC, allows contingency as NBC Sunday Night Football takes full contractual precedence over NASCAR events.

The Million Second Quiz was an example of a live broadcast of a game show that was filmed outdoors (it was filmed in an hourglass-shaped outdoor structure on top of a building with a flat roof). There was also an alternate indoor set where the non-primetime broadcasts took place. However, if inclement weather activity happened in the area where the show was filmed during primetime, the game show temporarily moved to its alternate set located inside the building. During the event, the clock did not stop for weather-related delays or other circumstances. The show was broadcast on NBC for only one season, after which it was canceled.

The 2011 NHL Winter Classic was scheduled to take place at 1 PM EST New Year's Day, but ended up delayed to 8 PM EST due to unusually warm weather in the Pittsburgh area, with rain impacting the game. Because the game was then moved to prime time, the game ended up having the unintended result of bringing in higher ratings for NBC in the United States, giving the NHL the highest ratings for a regular-season game since 1975. Despite this, subsequent Winter Classics remain played in the early afternoon hours, as the game is purposefully scheduled at that time to avoid the College Football Playoff bowl games, mainly the Rose Bowl Game and Sugar Bowl most years. The NHL Outdoors at Lake Tahoe games which were played in February 2021 were likewise delayed from their original daytime starts on NBC to late night on NBCSN unexpectedly, due to bright sunshine affecting the quality of the ice surface along the shoreline of Lake Tahoe.

See also
Weather-related cancellation

References

Baseball terminology
Baseball rules
Precipitation
Motorsport terminology